Ros Beiaard may refer to:

Bayard (legend), a magical horse known as (Ros) Beiaard in Dutch
Ros Beiaard Dendermonde, a festival related to the horse Bayard